The Guam Region Transit Authority is the only public transportation agency in the United States territory of Guam. Five lines circle the small island. Service is provided from 05:30 to 19:30 on Monday-Saturday, with no Sundays nor holiday services.

In 2011, budgetary problems nearly caused the agency to close. However, the bureau was saved by a veterans' assistance grant, which aimed to maintain and improve transportation options for the island's large military population. It is expected that the funding will also be used to overhaul the system design.

As of January 2020, the GRTA's fleet of 14 vehicles operating on six routes serve about 12,000 passengers per month.

Bus routes
The agency operates the following lines:

Blueline 1
Blueline 2
Blueline Express
Greenline
Greyline
Orangeline
Redline
Southern Shuttle

References

External links
 Official website

Transportation in Guam